The Olkaria III Geothermal Power Station, also known as 'OrPower 4' is a large geothermal power plant in Kenya, having an installed electricity generating capacity of .

Location
The facility is located adjacent to Hell's Gate National Park, along with its sister stations, Olkaria I, Olkaria II, and Olkaria IV. The geographical coordinates of Olkaria III Geothermal Power Station are 0°53'27.0"S, 36°17'21.0"E (Latitude:-0.890833; Longitude:36.289167).

History
In January 2009 new infrastructure was installed, adding another  to the plant's capacity. Later,  production capacity was installed.

Ownership
Olkaria III Power Station is owned and operated by Ormat Technologies Inc., a Reno, Nevada registered company, with production facilities in Yavne, Israel. According to Kenyan print media, Ormat Technologies Inc. sold 503 gigawatt hours (GWh) to Kenya Power and Lighting Company, earning KES:3.89 billion (US$45 million), in the 12 months ending 30 June 2013.

See also

List of power stations in Kenya 
Geothermal power in Kenya
Olkaria I Geothermal Power Station
Olkaria II Geothermal Power Station
Olkaria IV Geothermal Power Station
Olkaria V Geothermal Power Station

References

External links
Website of Ormat Technologies, Inc.

Nakuru County
Geothermal power stations in Kenya
Energy infrastructure completed in 2016
2016 establishments in Kenya